Dinod is a village in the Bhiwani district of the Indian state of Haryana. Dinod village founded by kaliRaman gotrA..

Geography 
Dinod is the largest village in the Tosham block of Bhiwani, approximately 7km west of the district headquarters of Bhiwani. Talav (Indian Lake) called Dulasar Johad .

Demographics 
, the village had 3,275 households with a total population of 15,792 of which 8,398 were male and 7,394 female. The village has 36 castes.

Culture 
Dinod's main temple is for Baba Dhuni Wala and Baba Hanumaan Garhi. Historic  

The headquarters of Radha Swami Satsang Dinod are located in Dinod. Every year, millions of followers visit Satsang Bhavan to attend satsangs that are held daily. Bhandaras and Satsangs (public feast and spiritual discourse) are organized on a large scale on Guru Purnima and Avtaran Diwas (Bade Maharaj Ji) attended by millions of devotees and villagers.

Education 
Dinod village has an ICS tuition branch for 6th to 12th class students. It also has a gaushala named Baba Dhuni Wala Goushala Trust. Dinod has a Govt. Girl Sr. Sec. School.

Notables 

 Chhalu Ram Gadhwal, of the Indian National Army or the Azad Hind Fauj is a son of this village. His statue is in Kurukshetra Museum.  
 Local boxer Paramjeet Samota won a gold medal in the Delhi Commonwealth Games. A stadium in Dinod is named after him.

References 

Villages in Bhiwani district